Ralph Nelson Whitfield McKenzie (born October 20, 1941) is an American mathematician, logician, and abstract algebraist. He received his doctorate from the University of Colorado Boulder in 1967.

He is a fellow of the American Mathematical Society.

Selected works
McKenzie with David Hobby: The structure of finite algebras, AMS 1988
McKenzie with Ralph Freese: Commutator Theory for Congruence Modular Varieties, London Math. Society Lecture Notes, Cambridge University Press 1987

References

Living people
1941 births
20th-century American mathematicians
People from Cisco, Texas
Fellows of the American Mathematical Society
Tarski lecturers
21st-century American mathematicians